De Leuf is a restaurant located in Ubachsberg, Limburg in the Netherlands. It is a fine dining restaurant that was awarded one or two Michelin stars in the period 1996 to present. GaultMillau awarded the restaurant 18.0 point. (Out of 20) 

Head chef of De Leuf is Paul van de Bunt. De Leuf is a member of Alliance Gastronomique Néerlandaise.

The restaurant is located in a farmhouse, that was originally built in 1759.

Star history
1996-2007: one star
2008-2012: two stars

See also
List of Michelin starred restaurants in the Netherlands

Sources and references 

Restaurants in the Netherlands
Michelin Guide starred restaurants in the Netherlands
De Leuf
De Leuf